Bib Doda Pasha (1820–1868) was the ruler of Mirdita. He held the Ottoman rank of kapedan (captain) and the honorific pasha (governor).

Family
Bib Doda belonged to the Gjonmarkaj clan which had led Mirdita for a long period. He started ruling his clan at a young age, since his father Gjok Doda was murdered. He married a Muslim woman , Hide (daughter of Hasan Ajazi), from Armalle village in the Lurë region. He was the father of Prenk Bib Doda, who would later play an important role in the Albanian politics of the early 20th century.

Agreement with Serbia
Bib Doda Pasha together with influential abbot Gaspër Krasniqi and Mark Prenk Lleshi from Mirdita, as representatives of Mirdita, reached an agreement with Serbian Internal Minister Ilija Garašanin in 1849 regarding cooperation with Serbia and Montenegro against the Ottoman Empire. Garašanin believed that Albania should be established as an independent state. The eventual Albanian state was to encompass territories between rivers Drin and Vjosë.

Activities against Albanian rebels
Bib Doda Pasha aided the Ottoman raids against the Albanian rebels of Dervish Cara, during the Albanian Revolt of 1843–44 in the sanjaks of Prizren, Scutari and Ohrid. He played a significant role in the expedition, and was decorated and awarded an honorary sabre and pistols. Doda received the title "Pasha" in 1849 and allowed to maintain an army up to 10,000 people.

His name came in the center of attention during the Montenegrin–Ottoman War (1861–62). Northern Albanian Catholic tribes were organized to start an uprising against the Ottomans led by abbot Gaspër Krasniqi, with the support of French emissaries of Napoleon III. Bib Doda who was still getting paid well by the Ottomans was not convinced of the benefits of the uprising and stayed out, thus not staying by his previous agreement with Garašanin. In spring 1862 he even tried to recruit some volunteers to aid the Ottomans. This led to a general mistrust and rage against him. Mirdita rebels raided and burnt his properties in Kallmet. Meanwhile, other rebels cut the roads that connected Shkodra with Prizren. Ottomans intervened and Gaspër Krasniqi was arrested. The Albanian uprising did not happen.

Death
With the death of Bib Doda Pasha in 1868, the Ottomans assigned a kaymakam from his own family, but removed his young son Prenk and exiled him to Turkey. He was buried in Shkodër.

Legacy
Bib Doda Pasha was regarded by the Albanians as a "murderer of his own people", in particular his role in the Uprising of Dervish Cara. There were allegations that the British and Austro-Hungarians were behind all this, interested in having the Ottoman Empire still strong in the Balkans.

References

Sources 
 
 
 
 

19th-century people from the Ottoman Empire
19th-century Albanian people
Ottoman military officers
Albanian Pashas
Ottoman Albanian nobility
People from Mirditë
Albanians from the Ottoman Empire
Albanian Roman Catholics
1820 births
1868 deaths
Albania–Serbia relations